Tonk Khurd is a city in Dewas district, in the state of Madhya Pradesh, India.

Demographics
As of the 2011 India census, Tonk Khurd had a population of  spread over  households. Males constitute 51.7% of the population and females 48.3%. Tonk Khurd has an average literacy rate of 77.56%, male literacy is 89.09%, and female literacy is 65.46%. 13.84% of the population is under 6 years of age.

Government and politics

Civic administration
Tonk Khurd is administered by a Nagar Parishad (City Council). Its responsibilities include sanitation, street lights, maintenance of birth and death records.

Representation in Parliament and State Assembly 
At the state level, Tonk Khurd falls within the Sonkatch (Vidhan Sabha constituency). As of November 2020, its representative in the Vidhan Sabha is Sajjan Singh Verma of the Indian National Congress. 

At the national level, the city is falls within the Dewas (Lok Sabha constituency). As of 2019, its Member of Parliament is 	Mahendra Solanki of the Bharatiya Janata Party.

Education
As of the 2011 census, Tonk Khurd had 10 primary schools, 2 middle schools, 6 secondary schools, 3 senior secondary schools and 1 degree-level college.

References

Cities and towns in Dewas district